A krama is a sturdy traditional Cambodian garment with many uses, including as a scarf, bandanna, to cover the face, for decorative purposes, and as a hammock for children.<ref>Shiv Shanker Tiwary (2009) Encyclopaedia Of Southeast Asia And Its Tribes’’, p. 185 </ref> It may also be used as a form of weaponry. Bokator fighters wrap the krama around their waists, heads and fists. It is worn by men, women and children, and can be fairly ornate, though most typical kramas contain a gingham pattern of some sort, and traditionally come in either red or blue. It is the Cambodian national symbol.

A closely related Thai garment is known as pha khao ma'' (ผ้าขาวม้า) and is worn in the Isan region by locals and by ethnic Khmers.

See also
Agal, Arabian headdress
Gamucha, scarf from Bengal
Gingham, scarf from Malaysia
Keffiyeh, traditional Middle Eastern headdress
Tagelmust, scarf from Sahara
Turban, head scarf
Khăn rằn, Vietnamese head scarf

References

Scarves
Headgear
Skirts
Cambodian clothing